The American University in London (AUL) was an accredited university in the United Kingdom before being suspended in April 2007.  It was located in Seven Sisters Road in London.

The AUL's business education programs had been accredited by the International Assembly for Collegiate Business Education (IACBE), but this accreditation was suspended in April 2007. The IACBE identified need for improvement in the areas of Outcomes Assessment, Strategic Planning, Financial Resources, External Oversight, and Business and Industry Linkages.

AUL had been in partnership with the Geneva Business School.

See also
American University (disambiguation) for a list of similarly named institutions
AUC Press

References

External links
Official website

For-profit universities and colleges in Europe
Unaccredited institutions of higher learning
Distance education institutions based in the United Kingdom
Defunct universities and colleges in London
1984 establishments in England
Educational institutions established in 1984